Eighth Lake is a lake located by Inlet, New York. It is part of the Fulton Chain Lakes. The outlet is connected to Seventh Lake by a creek. Fish species present in the lake are brown trout, lake trout, lake whitefish, smelt, rainbow trout, black bullhead, landlocked salmon, and pumpkinseed sunfish. There is a state owned fee hard surface ramp at Eighth Lake Campground on NY-28.

References 

Lakes of New York (state)
Lakes of Hamilton County, New York